This is a list of listed buildings in the parish of Hamilton in South Lanarkshire, Scotland.

List 

|}

Key

Notes

References
 All entries, addresses and coordinates are based on data from Historic Scotland. This data falls under the Open Government Licence

Hamilton
Buildings and structures in Hamilton, South Lanarkshire